Surusicaris is an extinct genus of bivalved arthropod, known from the Cambrian Burgess Shale of British Columbia, Canada. It is considered to be closely related to Isoxys, and like it has spined grasping frontal appendages.

Description 

The head has a pair of rounded eyes, and a pair of upward-curling segmented frontal appendages with at least five segments, the second, third and fourth of which bear a spine, with three long spines and at least one short spine on the fifth and terminal segment. The head also has three pairs of other limbs, which are stubby, uniramous and unsclerotised, with an annulated appearance, which are tipped with bifid claws. Along the trunk are 12 pairs of biramous limbs, which taper in size posteriorly. Their morphology is simple, the morphology of the endopod is similar to those of the anterior three uniramous head limbs, while the exopod is sub-lobate, elongate, and possibly flattened, with marginal setae and about the same length as the endopod. The posterior is poorly preserved, but may be a tail-piece formed by two lobes or a fan.

Taxonomy and ecology 
Surusicaris has been placed as a member of Isoxyida and Isoxyidae, both of which contain only one other genus, Isoxys. Isoxyids are considered to be basal stem-group arthropods. Isoxyids are thought to have been actively swimming predators.

References 

Burgess Shale fossils
Cambrian arthropods
Burgess Shale animals